Patrick Döring (born 6 May 1973 in Stade, Lower Saxony) is a German politician and member of the FDP in the Bundestag from 2005 to 2013.

Other activities
 Commerzbank, Member of the Regional Advisory Board for Northern Germany

References

External links 
 Bundestag biography 

1973 births
Living people
Members of the Bundestag for Lower Saxony
Members of the Bundestag 2009–2013
Members of the Bundestag 2005–2009
Members of the Bundestag for the Free Democratic Party (Germany)